The Sunday Roast was an Australian sports talk show that dealt with the issues in the National Rugby League.

In 2012, the show, by then hosted by Tim Gilbert following Voss's controversial demotion and ultimate departure from the Nine Network, was incorporated into The Sunday Footy Show as a shorter segment rather than airing as a separate show. In 2015, the segment was dropped altogether due to its sharp decline in popularity.

Hosts

Presenters
 Tim Gilbert 
 Adam MacDougall
 Terry Kennedy
 Brad Fittler

Former Presenters
Andrew Voss (2005–2011)
Matthew Johns
Mark Geyer (2005–2011)
Phil Gould
Laurie Daley
Ray Warren

See also

 
 List of Australian television series
 List of longest-running Australian television series
 The Sunday Footy Show (rugby league)

References

Nine's Wide World of Sport
2005 Australian television series debuts
2010s Australian television series
English-language television shows
Australian sports television series
Rugby league television shows